Pölchow is a municipality  in the Rostock district, in Mecklenburg-Vorpommern, Germany. The commune is administered by the Amt Warnow-West, which is located in the municipality of Kritzmow.

The districts Huckstorf and Wahrstorf belong to Pölchow.

The proximity to Rostock and the good traffic connection (Baltic Sea motorway A 20) let the municipality grow strongly in the last years. In addition to the numerous homes that have been built, a number of commercial enterprises have also settled in the town.

Geography
The municipality of Pölchow is about ten kilometres south of the Rostock city centre. The area around the municipality is about 40 m higher than the valley of the lower Warnow, which has been designated a landscape conservation area east of Pölchow.

References